St. Mary's River State Park is a public recreation area located in St. Mary's County, Maryland. The park is managed by the  Maryland Department of Natural Resources.

History
The state acquired land for the park's first site between 1968 and 1974, with the lake being constructed in 1975. Acquisition of the park's second site began with the purchase of 450 acres in 1968; further acquisitions occurred until 1983.

Activities and amenities
The park features fishing, non-motorized boating, canoeing, picnicking, and hunting. A  trail around St. Mary's Lake is used for hiking, horseback riding, and mountain biking.

References

External links
St. Mary's River State Park Maryland Department of Natural Resources
Maps of St. Mary's River State Park Maryland Department of Natural Resources

State parks of Maryland
Parks in St. Mary's County, Maryland
Protected areas established in 1968
1968 establishments in Maryland